Knema kostermansiana is a species of plant in the family Myristicaceae. It is a tree endemic to Borneo. These trees typically vary from about six to 20 meters in height. The leaves are membranous (thin and transparent), chartaceous (paper-like), and elliptic. Possessing short fruit that are typically solitary or grouped with only one or two others, the tree possesses raised nerves.

References

kostermansiana
Endemic flora of Borneo
Trees of Borneo
Vulnerable plants
Taxonomy articles created by Polbot